Sigvard Bergh is a retired Swedish footballer. Bergh made 16 Allsvenskan appearances for Djurgården and scored 1 goals.

References

Swedish footballers
Djurgårdens IF Fotboll players
Association footballers not categorized by position